In the Middle of the Night may refer to:

 In the Middle of the Night (film), a 1984 Danish film directed by Erik Balling
In the Middle of the Night (novel), a 1995 young-adult novel by Robert Cormier
In the Middle of the Night, an album by Aerial, 1978
"In the Middle of the Night" (Magic Affair song), 1994
 "In the Middle of the Night", a song by Madness from One Step Beyond..., 1979
 "In the Middle of the Night", a song by Martha Wainwright from I Know You're Married But I've Got Feelings Too, 2008

See also
Middle of the Night (disambiguation)